Doing God's Work – A Creation Compilation is a various artists compilation album of British indie music released in 1987 by Creation Records. The album was released in vinyl and CD format.

Track listing
Phil Wilson: "Ten Miles" – 3:02
Biff Bang Pow: "In a Mourning Town" – 2:37
Momus: "Murderers" – 5:18
The House of Love: "Shine On" – 3:20
Jasmine Minks: "Cut me Deep" – 3:26
David Westlake: "The Word Around Town" – 3:35
Nikki Sudden & the Jacobites: "Kiss at Dawn" – 5:23
Blow-up: "Catch Me" – 2:54

References

Creation Records compilation albums
Indie rock albums by British artists
Indie rock compilation albums
1987 compilation albums